The Greenfield Ministry was the combined Cabinet (called Executive Council of Alberta), chaired by Premier Herbert Greenfield, and Ministers that governed Alberta during the 5th Alberta Legislature from August 13, 1921 to November 23, 1925.

The Executive Council (commonly known as the cabinet) was made up of members of the United Farmers of Alberta which held a majority of seats in the Legislative Assembly of Alberta. The cabinet was appointed by the Lieutenant Governor of Alberta on the advice of the Premier.

List of ministers

See also 

 Executive Council of Alberta
 List of Alberta provincial ministers

References 

 

Politics of Alberta
Executive Council of Alberta
1921 establishments in Alberta
1925 disestablishments in Alberta
Cabinets established in 1921
Cabinets disestablished in 1925